Wheaton is a city in Traverse County, Minnesota, United States.  The population was 1,460 at the 2020 census.  It is the county seat.

History
A post office called Wheaton has been in operation since 1884. Wheaton was designated county seat in 1886. The city was named for Daniel Thompson Wheaton, a railroad surveyor. One property in the city is listed on the National Register of Historic Places: the Wheaton Depot, built circa 1906.

Geography
Wheaton lies along the Mustinka River.

U.S. Highway 75 and Minnesota State Highway 27 are two of the city's main routes.

Climate

Demographics

2010 census
As of the census of 2010, there were 1,424 people, 655 households, and 370 families living in the city. The racial makeup of the city was 97.4% White, 0.6% African American, 0.7% Native American, 0.1% Asian, 0.1% Pacific Islander, 0.2% from other races, and 1.0% from two or more races. Hispanic or Latino of any race were 1.5% of the population.

There were 655 households, of which 21.8% had children under the age of 18 living with them, 48.4% were married couples living together, 6.1% had a female householder with no husband present, 2.0% had a male householder with no wife present, and 43.5% were non-families. 39.8% of all households were made up of individuals, and 24% had someone living alone who was 65 years of age or older. The average household size was 2.08 and the average family size was 2.79.

The median age in the city was 49.5 years. 20.4% of residents were under the age of 18; 5.3% were between the ages of 18 and 24; 18.5% were from 25 to 44; 24.3% were from 45 to 64; and 31.5% were 65 years of age or older. The gender makeup of the city was 47.2% male and 52.8% female.

2000 census
As of the census of 2000, there were 1,619 people, 747 households, and 434 families living in the city. The racial makeup of the city was 99.20% White, 0.37% Native American, 0.31% Asian, 0.06% Pacific Islander, and 0.06% from two or more races. Hispanic or Latino of any race were 1.42% of the population.

There were 747 households, out of which 23.3% had children under the age of 18 living with them, 48.1% were married couples living together, 7.9% had a female householder with no husband present, and 41.8% were non-families. 39.1% of all households were made up of individuals, and 25.8% had someone living alone who was 65 years of age or older. The average household size was 2.07 and the average family size was 2.76.

In the city, the population was spread out, with 21.4% under the age of 18, 5.0% from 18 to 24, 20.7% from 25 to 44, 20.3% from 45 to 64, and 32.7% who were 65 years of age or older. The median age was 48 years. For every 100 females, there were 86.1 males.  For every 100 females age 18 and over, there were 83.4 males.

The median income for a household in the city was $29,219, and the median income for a family was $41,827. Males had a median income of $30,313 versus $19,750 for females. The per capita income for the city was $18,181. About 7.2% of families and 10.9% of the population were below the poverty line, including 11.7% of those under age 18 and 12.6% of those age 65 or over.

Politics

References

External links

City Website

Cities in Minnesota
Cities in Traverse County, Minnesota
County seats in Minnesota